Supergame may refer to:
 Supergame (role-playing game)
 Supergame (association football), a football match held in Sweden
 Supergame (finite game)
 Super Bowl I